The Park Is Mine may refer to

The Park Is Mine (novel), a 1981 novel by Stephen Peters 
The Park Is Mine (1986 film), based on the novel and starring Tommy Lee Jones and Helen Shaver
The Park Is Mine, the soundtrack album to the film, composed by Tangerine Dream
The Park Is Mine (Pulp video), a 1998 live video by the band Pulp